This is a list of protected areas of the Maldives:

Angafaru
Hanifaru
South Ari Atoll MPA
Hithaadhoo (Baa Atoll)
Olhugiri (Baa Atoll)
Hurasdhoo
Huraa Mangrove Area
Eidhigali Kilhi and Koattey Area
Fushee Kandu
Filitheyo Kandu
Lhazikuraadi
Vattaru Kandu
Faruhuruvalhibeyru
Kashibeyru Thila
Lankan Thila
Kuredhu Kanduolhi
Dhigali Haa
Vilingili Thila
Fushivaru Thila
Miyaru Kandu
Kudarah Thila
Mushimasmigili Thila
Orimas Thila
Mayaa Thila
Guraidhoo Kanduolhi
Emboodhoo Kanduolhi
Gulhifalhu Medhuga onna kohlavaanee
Dhekunu Thilafalhuge Miyaruvani
Kuda Haa
Gaathugiri
Thamburudhoo Thila
Makunudhoo Kandu Olhi
Rasfari island, lagoon and the surrounding reef

References

Maldives
Environment of the Maldives
Protected areas
Protected areas